Mansons Landing Provincial Park is a provincial park in British Columbia, Canada, located at Mansons Landing on Cortes Island.

References

Provincial parks of British Columbia
Provincial Parks of the Gulf Islands
Cortes Island
1974 establishments in British Columbia
Protected areas established in 1974